Federica Valenti (born June 29, 1969) is an Italian voice actress who has been featured as the voice of main characters in a number of anime television shows that have aired in Italy.

Roles
* Bolded names indicate a major role in the work.

Anime (film)
Detective Conan: The Time Bombed Skyscraper (1997) - Ayumi Yoshida
Detective Conan: Captured in Her Eyes (2000) - Ayumi Yoshida

Anime (OAV)
 3x3 Eyes Seima Densetsu (1995) - Pai

Anime (TV show)
 Barbapapa (1978) - Barbottina
 Dr. Slump (second dub, 1980/86) - Kinoko Sarada and Tsururin Tsun 
 The Adventures of Hutch the Honeybee (1987) - Petunia
 Attack No. 1 (1993) - Mimi Ayuhara
 Bit the Cupid (1995) - Giada
 Baby & Me (1996) - Midori
 Cardcaptor Sakura (1998) - Akane (ep 15); Naoko Yanagisawa; Spinel Sun (Small)
 Barbapapa Sekai wo Mawaru (1999) - Barbottina
 Beyblade (2002) - Mariam
 Detective Conan (2002) - Ayumi Yoshida
 Aria the Animation (2005) - Direttore Aria Pokteng
 Aria the Natural (2006) - Direttore Aria Pokteng
 Aria the Origination (2008) - Direttore Aria Pokteng
 Blue Dragon: Tenkai no Shichi Ryū (2010) - Noi
 Pokémon (2003) - Max
 Yu-Gi-Oh! Zexal (2011) - Hart Tenjo

Western animation
 My Little Pony: Friendship Is Magic - Rainbow Dash 
 Cubix - DonDon
 Fireman Sam (2004 series) - Mandy Flood 
 Invader Zim - GIR
 Rocket Power - Regina "Reggie" Rocket
 Franklin and Friends - Skunk 
 Danny Phantom - Samantha "Sam" Manson
 Dexter's Laboratory - Dexter
 ChalkZone - Major Brand

References

External links
 

Italian voice actresses
1969 births
Actors from Turin
Living people